The F Liberal (F-43) is a Niterói-class frigate of the Brazilian Navy. The Defensora was the fourth ship of her class ordered by the Brazilian Navy, on 20 September 1970. The Niterói was launched on 7 February 1977, and was commissioned on  18 November 1978.

History
On October 15, 1998, the ship was docked to be submitted to the General Maintenance Period (PMG), and together with the Modernization Program (ModFrag).

From May 15 to July 12, the Ship was in the SWORDFISH / 2008 Commission, carrying out a presence action in the ports visited, strengthening ties of friendship between the navies of other countries and improving the degree of training of the ship in Operation Joint with the Armed Forces of Portugal and other participants. Participated in the commemorations related to the Naval Battle of Riachuelo (11JUN08) in the port of Lisbon; and made operational visits

Gallery

References

Niteroi-class frigates
1977 ships
Ships built in Southampton
Frigates of the Cold War